The 2015 Blancpain GT Series season was the second season of the Blancpain GT Series. The season started on 6 April at Nogaro and ended on 11 October in Zandvoort. The season featured twelve rounds, five Blancpain Endurance Series rounds and seven Blancpain Sprint Series rounds.

Calendar
On June 6 2015 it was announced that Circuit Park Zandvoort would replace Baku as the final round of the season due to economic reasons.

Race results

Championship standings

Scoring system
Championship points were awarded for the first six positions in each Qualifying Race and for the first ten positions in each Championship Race. Entries were required to complete 75% of the winning car's race distance in order to be classified and earn points. Individual drivers were required to participate for a minimum of 25 minutes in order to earn championship points in any race. There were no points awarded for the Pole Position.

Qualifying Race points

Championship Race points

1000 km Paul Ricard points

24 Hours of Spa points
Points were awarded after six hours, after twelve hours and at the finish.

Drivers' Championship

(key) Bold – Pole position Italics – Fastest lap

Notes
1 – Markus Winkelhock was unable to score at Moscow, because he did not share his car with another driver. His regular teammate Nikolaus Mayr-Melnhof had to go home just before the event started.

Teams' Championship

See also
2015 Blancpain Endurance Series
2015 Blancpain Sprint Series

Notes

References

External links

GT World Challenge Europe
2015 in motorsport